Härnösands AIK is a sports club in Härnösand, Sweden, established in 1945 and originally thought to be called BK Virgo but required to change name because the other name was already used. Active within bandy, the club earlier even ran soccer, track and field athletics, skiing and table tennis activity.

The men's bandy team played in the Swedish top division during the season of 1984–1985. The women's bandy team has played several seasons in the Swedish top division.

References

External links
Official website 

1945 establishments in Sweden
Athletics clubs in Sweden
Bandy clubs in Sweden
Defunct football clubs in Sweden
Ski clubs in Sweden
Sport in Härnösand
Bandy clubs established in 1945
Table tennis clubs in Sweden